Winifred Eveleen Gérin , née Bourne, (7 October 1901 – 28 June 1981) was an English biographer born in Hamburg. She is best known as a biographer of the Brontë sisters and their brother Branwell, whose lives she researched extensively. Charlotte Brontë: the Evolution of Genius (1967) is regarded as her seminal work and received the James Tait Black Memorial Prize, the Rose Mary Crawshay Prize and the Royal Society of Literature Heinemann prize.

Family
Winifred was the daughter of Frederick Charles Bourne (1859–1928) and Katherine née Hill (1859-1943), a great-grand-daughter of Sir Hugh Hill, 1st Baronet Hill of Brook Hall. Her parents met when her father was a manager for the chemical company Nobel Industries in Hamburg and her mother was working there as a governess. They married in Hamburg and Winifred and her two elder brothers, Charles Philip Bourne (1897–?) and Roger Hereward Bourne (1898–1979) were all born there. Her first husband, Eugène Jules Telesphore Gérin (1896–1945) was a Belgian cellist whom she first heard playing at a concert in Cannes. Winifred spoke fluent French and German and, during the Second World War she worked for the political intelligence department of the British Foreign Office. Eugène died in 1945 and, later Winifred met John Lock. They married in 1955 and lived together at Haworth, he was the co-author, with Canon W T Dixon, of "A Man of Sorrow: The Life, Letters, and Times of the Rev. Patrick Brontë".

Education

Sydenham High School for Girls
Newnham College, Cambridge (graduated 1923)

Awards and distinctions

James Tait Black Memorial Prize (1967)
Rose Mary Crawshay Prize (1967)
Royal Society of Literature Heinemann prize (1967)
Fellow of the Royal Society of Literature (1968)
OBE (1975)

Works
Anne Brontë, Thomas Nelson, 1959
Branwell Brontë, Thomas Nelson, 1961
The young Fanny Burney, Thomas Nelson, 1961
Charlotte Brontë : the evolution of genius, Clarendon, 1967
Horatia Nelson, Clarendon, 1970
Emily Brontë : a biography Clarendon, 1971
The Brontës, Longman, 1973
Elizabeth Gaskell : a biography, Clarendon, 1976
Anne Thackeray Ritchie : a biography, Oxford University Press, 1981

References

External links
 Gerin's publications at Amazon.com
 Gerin's entry in the Oxford Dictionary of National Biography
 A University of Michigan comparison of biographies of Charlotte Bronte

1901 births
1981 deaths
English biographers
Officers of the Order of the British Empire
Writers from Hamburg
Fellows of the Royal Society of Literature
Rose Mary Crawshay Prize winners
James Tait Black Memorial Prize recipients
Alumni of Newnham College, Cambridge
People educated at Sydenham High School
20th-century biographers